Craig Reynolds (born Harold Hugh Enfield, July 15, 1907 – October 22, 1949) was an American film actor of the 1930s and 1940s.

Early life and career
Reynolds was born in Anaheim, California, in 1907, the son of Leila Maybelle (née Goold) and Oscar Davenport Enfield. Reynolds enjoyed a film career spanning the 1930s and 1940s, although the majority of his roles occurred during the first decade of his career.

In 1933 the actor signed with Universal Pictures, playing supporting roles in features and a Buck Jones serial. During this period he was billed as Hugh Enfield. The serial unit gave him a starring role in the 1934 version of The Perils of Pauline, billing him as Robert Allen. 

After his tenure with Universal, he appeared in three features for Paramount Pictures in 1935 before being signed by Warner Brothers that same year. Warners rechristened him Craig Reynolds and groomed him as a rising star. He played second leads and featured roles in "A" pictures, and leads in "B" pictures. It is for these 27 Warner films that Craig Reynolds is best known.

After his Warner contract ran out, Reynolds kept busy freelancing for other studios including Columbia, Republic, Monogram, and PRC. He interrupted his career to enlist in the armed forces during World War II, and was awarded a Purple Heart before being released from military service. He resumed his career in 1944 and worked in occasional features for the next five years. He died in October 1949, aged 42, in an accident while riding a motor scooter in Los Angeles.

Personal life
He married actress Barbara Pepper in 1943, with whom he had two sons, John and Dennis. After his death in 1949, she never remarried.

Filmography

1929: Coquette - Young Townsman at Dance (uncredited)
1933: Phantom of the Air - Blade (uncredited)
1933: Don't Bet on Love - Reporter (uncredited)
1933: Gordon of Ghost City - Henchman Ed (as Hugh Enfield)
1933: Saturday's Millions - Football Player (uncredited)
1933: Only Yesterday - Hugh (uncredited)
1933: The Perils of Pauline - Robert Ward (as Robert Allen)
1934: Cross Country Cruise - First Bus Driver (as Hugh Enfield)
1934: I'll Tell the World - Aviator (as Hugh Enfield)
1934: Let's Be Ritzy - Clerk
1934: Millionaire for a Day - Clerk (as Hugh Enfield)
1934: Love Birds - Bus Driver
1934: Million Dollar Ransom - Eddie (as Hugh Enfield)
1935: Rumba - Bromley (uncredited)
1935: Four Hours to Kill! - Frank (as Hugh Enfield)
1935: Paris in Spring - Alphonse (as Hugh Enfield)
1935: The Case of the Lucky Legs - Frank Patton
1935: Man of Iron - Mr. Harry Adams
1935: Dangerous - Reporter (uncredited)
1936: Ceiling Zero - Joe Allen
1936: The Preview Murder Mystery - Actor (uncredited)
1936: Boulder Dam - Dam Worker (uncredited)
1936: Times Square Playboy - Joe Roberts
1936: His Best Man - Joe Roberts
1936: Treachery Rides the Range - Wade Carter
1936: Sons o' Guns - Lieut. Burton
1936: The Golden Arrow - Jorgenson
1936: Jailbreak - Ken Williams
1936: Stage Struck - Gilmore Frost
1936: The Voice of Scandal - Rex Marchbanks
1936: The Case of the Black Cat - Frank Oafley
1937: Smart Blonde - Tom Carney
1937: The Great O'Malley - Motorist Honking Horn
1937: Penrod and Sam - Roy 'Dude' Hanson
1937: Melody for Two - William 'Bill' Hallam
1937: The Go Getter - Sailor on the Macon (uncredited)
1937: The Case of the Stuttering Bishop - Gordon Bixler
1937: Slim - Gambler
1937: The Footloose Heiress - Bruce 'Butch' Baeder
1937: Back in Circulation - 'Snoopy' Davis, a Reporter
1937: The Great Garrick - M. Janin
1937: Under Suspicion - Nelson Dudley
1938: Romance Road (Short) - Flood
1938: Making the Headlines - Reporter Steve Withers
1938: Female Fugitive - Jim Mallory
1938: Romance on the Run - Charlie Cooper
1938: Gold Mine in the Sky - Larry Cummings
1938: Slander House - Pat Fenton
1938: I Am a Criminal - Clint Reynolds
1939: Navy Secrets - CPO Jimmy Woodford
1939: The Mystery of Mr. Wong - Peter Harrison
1939: Wall Street Cowboy - Tony McGrath
1939: The Gentleman from Arizona - 'Van' Van Wyck
1940: Mr. Wong at Headquarters - Frank Belden, Jr.
1940: Son of the Navy - Brad Wheeler
1940: I Take This Oath - Joe Kelly
1944: Nevada - Cash Burridge
1945: The Strange Affair of Uncle Harry - John Warren
1945: Divorce - Bill Endicott
1945: The Lost Weekend - George, M.M.'s Escort (uncredited)
1946: Just Before Dawn - Jack Swayne (uncredited)
1946: Queen of Burlesque - Joe Nolan
1946: My Dog Shep - W. D. Stanfield, Attorney
1947: The Fabulous Texan - State Policeman (uncredited)
1948: The Man from Colorado - Parry (uncredited) (final film role)

References

External links

1907 births
1949 deaths
20th-century American male actors
Male actors from Anaheim, California
American male film actors
American military personnel of World War II
Motorcycle road incident deaths
Road incident deaths in California
Burials at Forest Lawn Memorial Park (Glendale)